The 2009–10 Boston University Terriers men's basketball team represented Boston University in the 2009–10 NCAA Division I men's basketball season. The Terriers were led by head coach Patrick Chambers in his first year leading the team after being hired as head coach in April of 2009. Boston University played their home games at Agganis Arena and Case Gym in Boston, Massachusetts, as members of the America East Conference. 

The Terriers finished conference play with an 11–5 record, earning the fourth seed in the America East tournament. Boston University made a run to the America East Championship game, but were defeated in the title game by Vermont.

Boston University failed to qualify for the NCAA tournament, but were invited to the 2010 College Basketball Invitational. The Terriers won their first two games in the CBI, earning their first postseason victories since 1959 and advancing to the semifinals of the CBI. They were eliminated by eventual tournament champion VCU, 88–75.

The Terriers finished the season with a 21–14 record.

Roster 

Source

Schedule and results

|-
!colspan=9 style=|Regular season

|-
!colspan=9 style=| America East tournament

|-
!colspan=9 style=| CBI

References

Boston University Terriers men's basketball seasons
Boston University
Boston University
Boston University men's basketball
Boston University men's basketball